

Rudolf Peschel (21 April 1894 – 30 June 1944) was a general in the Wehrmacht of Nazi Germany during World War II. He was a recipient of the Knight's Cross of the Iron Cross.  Peschel was killed in action on 30 June 1944 during the Vitebsk–Orsha Offensive.

Awards and decorations

 Knight's Cross of the Iron Cross on 20 January 1944 as Generalleutnant and commander of 6. Luftwaffen-Feld-Division

References

Citations

Bibliography

 

1894 births
1944 deaths
Military personnel from Strasbourg
Lieutenant generals of the German Army (Wehrmacht)
German Army personnel of World War I
People from Alsace-Lorraine
Recipients of the Gold German Cross
Recipients of the Knight's Cross of the Iron Cross
Prussian Army personnel
German Army personnel killed in World War II
Recipients of the clasp to the Iron Cross, 1st class
German Army generals of World War II